Parque Trianon (officially Parque Tenente Siqueira Campos) is a park located on Paulista Avenue in São Paulo, Brazil. Lieutenant Siqueira Campos Park is the official name of the park that was named after the Brazilian military officer and politician who participated in the Tenentist Revolt that occurred in 1924, one of the most important events that occurred in the city of São Paulo.

References 

Parks in São Paulo